The politics of Prince Edward Island are centred on a provincial government resembling that of the other Canadian provinces. The capital of the province of Prince Edward Island is Charlottetown, where the lieutenant governor and the premier reside, and the provincial legislature, and cabinet are located.

The Legislature
Prince Edward Island's government is based on the Westminster model, with a unicameral legislature – the Legislative Assembly of Prince Edward Island – consisting of 27 Members of the Legislative Assembly (MLAs), elected from 27 roughly equal electoral districts using plurality voting. The legislature may sit for a maximum of five years, as is customary in the Westminster system, and may be dissolved at any time by the lieutenant-governor, normally on the advice of the premier. By custom, the provincial Cabinet (which currently has ten members) is drawn exclusively from the Legislative Assembly, and must secure the support of a majority of the Assembly's members.

Political History

Prince Edward Island is a Canadian province consisting of an island of the same name. The island is part of Mi'kma'ki, the lands of the Mi'kmaq people. Explored by Europeans in the 16th century, the French claimed all of the lands of the Maritimes in 1604 and French colonists arrived in 1720. By conquest, the British claimed all of the lands including Prince Edward Island in 1763. It became the British colony of St. John Island in 1769 and joined the Canadian Confederation on July 1, 1873.

Electoral history

The Two-party era (1873–1996)

The Post-Two party era (1996–present)

Notes

Political parties

Prince Edward Island used to have the purest two-party system of any level of government in Canada until both 1996 and 2015 elections. Since joining the Canadian Confederation in 1873, the province has been governed at intervals by the Liberal Party of Prince Edward Island and the Progressive Conservative Party of Prince Edward Island (which has gone by other names in the past). Third Party candidates have held a total of three seats during that time. In the Prince Edward Island 1996 election, Herb Dickieson of the Island New Democrats was the elected member for West Point-Bloomfield. He served from 1996 to 2000. The next third party candidate to earn a seat in the provincial legislature was in the 2015 election when Peter Bevan-Baker, leader of the Green Party of Prince Edward Island, was elected in the riding of Kellys Cross-Cumberland. In a 2017 by-election PEI Green Party member Hannah Bell was elected from Charlottetown-Parkdale, marking the first time in Prince Edward Island's politics that two third-party candidates had held seats in the legislature.

In the 2019 election, however, the Green Party became the new official opposition party, while the Liberals became the new third party. Thus its two-party system finally ended to become a semi-two-party system.

Political parties are registered in the province, under Section 24 of the Election Act.

The Progressive Conservative Party
The Progressive Conservative Party of Prince Edward Island, founded in 1873, was a fully incorporated wing of the Progressive Conservative Party of Canada (and its antecedents) until the federal party was disbanded in 2003. It is not formally a part of the new Conservative Party of Canada, but the two organizations share members, and most senior provincial officials have openly stated support for the federal party. It has governed frequently, most recently from 1996 to 2007. The party is strongly of the Red Tory political tradition.  In October 2011, "The Progressive Conservatives boosted their seat count from two to five," out of 27. Due to a floor crossing on October 3, 2013, followed the next day by an expulsion of an MLA, the seat total fell to three. The party won 8 seats in the 2015 election to expand its seats as the official opposition. The party won 12 seats in the 2019 election, to become the first minority government since 1893. It increased its seat count to 13 in an extension election in July 2019, then won a by-election in November 2020, to up their number to 14 seats, thus becoming a majority government.

Green Party
The Green Party of Prince Edward Island was founded in 2005, and ran in the 2007 election for the first time. The party received a larger proportion of the total vote than the NDP during the 2007 provincial election.

In July 2012, the Green Party of PEI leader and co-founder Sharon Labchuk resigned. Darcie Lanthier served as interim leader until November 2012. At the Leadership Convention in Charlottetown, 3 November 2012, the Green Party of Prince Edward Island elected Peter Bevan-Baker as leader. Bevan-Baker was elected to the Legislature in 2015, winning the party's first seat since the party was founded. He was joined in the Legislature by Hannah Bell in a 2017 by–election. In the 2019 election, they surpassed the Liberal Party by both seat size and popular vote to become the province's Official Opposition party, as they gained six more seats from the Liberal Party.

The Liberal Party
The Liberal Party of Prince Edward Island, founded in 1873, is a fully incorporated wing of the Liberal Party of Canada. It has governed frequently, including several notable stretches from 1891 to 1911 and 1935 to 1959. It most recently held government from 2007 to 2019.  In October 2011, the Liberal Party lost two seats, but retained 22 out of 27 seats in the Legislature. The seat total was 23 from October 3, 2013, following a floor crossing, until February 23, 2015, due to three MLA resignations, thus reducing to 20. The party dropped to 18 seats in the 2015 election. Then in 2017 due to a resignation (and loss in subsequent by-election), followed by a floor crossing in 2018, the party dropped to 16 seats. And even did worst in the 2019 election as the Green Party and less so the Progressive Conservative Party, took a majority of all their seats, which reduced the Liberals to 6 seats. This rendered the Liberals as the province's third party for the first time in their history. The party was further reduced to 5 seats in September 2020, with the resignation of an MLA and subsequent loss of the resultant by-election in November 2020.

The New Democratic Party
The New Democratic Party of Prince Edward Island, founded in 1962, are a fully incorporated wing of the New Democratic Party of Canada. While nominally included as one of the Island's major political parties, it has elected only one member in its history, usually performing poorly in general elections and finishing behind the other parties. The party's candidates often finish last out of party-affiliated candidates in each riding, though in 2000 Herb Dickieson, the sitting MLA, finished second, and in 1947, a Co-operative Commonwealth Federation (precursor to the NDP) candidate finished second in a riding with a Conservative candidate who had been thrown out of the party. The New Democrats are currently unrepresented in the legislature. Michelle Neill was elected party leader on April 23, 2022, succeeding Joe Byrne who had resigned on September 1, 2020.

Political culture
PEI has been called the closest thing to a direct democracy in Canada. Because of its small population (135,851 residents, as of the 2006 Canadian census) and sizable legislature, each MLA represents, at most, approximately 5,000 people. Ridings, especially urban ones, tend to be quite small. The result of this is that almost everyone knows their MLA personally, or through a friend or colleague. Provincial elections on PEI make next to no use of television and radio advertising, and are instead fought house-to-house, since tiny districts make it realistically possible to visit almost every constituent while campaigning.

Voter turnout on Prince Edward Island is the highest for any jurisdiction in North America above the municipal level. For example, the 2003 election occurred on the day after Hurricane Juan struck, knocking out power to much of the Island and felling trees, but turnout was higher than 80%. Turnout for federal elections tends to be somewhat lower than turnout for provincial elections. Because of the small districts, even a handful of votes can swing a district. In 2003, three MLAs were elected with victory margins of less than 100 votes, and only two with margins of more than 1000 votes.

Patronage is a strong element of traditional Island politics, and has been a widely accepted practice for generations. Recent political discrimination rulings based on the Charter of Rights and Freedoms have put this longstanding tradition into question, however.

In 2010, some PEI politicians expressed concerns that eliminating the "long form" census would form a less detailed picture of PEI, and thus hurt the island's population by way of reduced Confederation programs. Politicians expressing worry about these developments included MP Shawn Murphy (Liberal-Charlottetown) and PEI Finance Minister Wes Sheridan (also a Liberal).

Issues
Because of the highly centrist trend that characterizes both major parties, elections are rarely fought on wildly contrasting platforms, and instead on a collection of local issues. Recently, a prominent issue has been the continued operation of the Island's five rural hospitals, which is increasingly questioned by the growing urban population.

Prince Edward Island is dependent on federal equalization payments for much of its budget. The economy is heavily based on agriculture, the fishery, and tourism, bioscience, with no natural resources or heavy industry (although light manufacturing of avionics parts is growing in importance). The provincial government often has a budgetary deficit, given the lack of local revenues and dependency on federal funds. The continued maintenance of traditional industries is often debated, as well as the need to diversify the province's economy.

Overview of federal politics
Under the Canadian Constitution, Prince Edward Island is entitled to four seats in the Senate of Canada, and a corresponding minimum of four seats in the House of Commons of Canada. This results in PEI being considerably overrepresented in the current House, as six of Canada's ten provinces are to varying degrees.

As of April 2019, PEI is regarded as a stronghold for the Liberal Party of Canada, having been represented exclusively by Liberal Members of Parliament from 1988 until 2008. In 2006, it was one of only two provinces (the other being Alberta) to give more than 50 percent of its votes to a single party. Much of this can be attributed to the total collapse and eventual demise of the Progressive Conservative Party of Canada, which had previously been the stronger of PEI's two competing political parties for much of the 20th century. The Reform Party/Canadian Alliance rejected Red Toryism, and the Conservative Party of Canada has yet to be accepted as a legitimate heir to the old Progressive Conservatives. The federal New Democratic Party has never attracted much support on PEI, although it is more successful than its provincial counterpart. In 2008, Gail Shea became the first conservative MP from PEI since 1988.

In the most recent federal election of 2019, however, the Greens have seen a rise in support, as their Official Opposition status on the provincial level has benefitted it on the federal stage. However, all 4 seats remain in Liberal hands.

See also

 Politics of Canada
 Political culture of Canada
 Council of the Federation
 Political parties of Prince Edward Island
 List of Prince Edward Island general elections (post-Confederation)
 Premier of Prince Edward Island (list)
 Lieutenant-Governor of Prince Edward Island
 Legislative Assembly of Prince Edward Island

References

External links

General information
 Political History on the Government of Prince Edward Island website
 Women in Prince Edward Island Politics on the Government of Prince Edward Island website
 Prince Edward Island History and Politics at InfoPlease.com
 List of Political Science courses at the University of Prince Edward Island website, including PoliSci 202: Politics and Government of Prince Edward Island
 Prince Edward Island Joins Confederation 1873 at A Country by Consent, by the Canada History Project
 PEIBlogs.com -- "the definitive Prince Edward Island blogroll since 2004"

Political parties
 Green Party of PEI

Other sources
 Francis William Pius Bolger, Prince Edward Island and Confederation: 1863-1873, CCHA, Report, 28 (1961), 25–30.